World Series Baseball 2K3 is a sports video game developed by Visual Concepts and published by Sega for the PlayStation 2 and Xbox. It is the successor to World Series Baseball 2K2 and the last to carry the World Series Baseball name. It was released in March 2003 prior to the start of the 2003 Major League Baseball season. It was originally developed for the GameCube, but was ultimately canceled. Entertainment Weekly gave the same console version universal acclaim despite the fact that it was canceled months ago.

Reception

The game received "generally favorable reviews" on both platforms, both a few points shy of "universal acclaim", according to the review aggregation website Metacritic.

GameSpot named the Xbox version the best game of March 2003.

See also
 Major League Baseball 2K5

References

External links
 

2003 video games
Cancelled GameCube games
PlayStation 2 games
RenderWare games
Sega video games
Video games developed in the United States
World Series Baseball video games
Xbox games